Minuscule 686 (in the Gregory-Aland numbering), Θε34 (von Soden), is a Greek minuscule manuscript of the New Testament, on parchment. It is dated by a colophon to the year 1337. Some leaves of the manuscript were lost. Scrivener labelled it by 573e.

Description 

The codex contains the text of the four Gospels, on 226 parchment leaves (size ), with only two lacunae (Matthew 1:1-6:18; Luke 24:47-53). The text is written in one column per page, 29 lines per page.
The breathings and accents are remarkable incorrect.

According to Scrivener the manuscript is "coarsely written on thick vellum".

Text 

The Greek text of the codex is a representative of the Byzantine text-type. Kurt Aland placed it in Category V.

According to the Claremont Profile Method it creates textual cluster 686, along with the manuscripts 716 (Luke 20), 748, 1198 (Luke 1 and 10), and 2693 (Luke 1). The cluster has following profile (the word before the bracket is the reading of the UBS edition):

 Luke 1:
 Luke 1:10 — ην του λαου ] του λαου ην
 Luke 1:15 — του ] omit
 Luke 1:34 — εσται ] εσται μοι
 Luke 1:44 — εν αγαλλιασει το βρεφος ] το βρεφος εν αγαλλιασει
 Luke 1:50 — γενεας και γενεας ] γενεαν και γενεαν TR reads: γενεας και γενεαν
 Luke 1:63 — εστι(ν) ] εσται
 Luke 1:65 — παντα ] omit

 Luke 10:
 Luke 10:1 — ημελλεν ] εμελλεν
 Luke 10:6 — εαν ] εαν μεν
 Luke 10:11 — εις τους ποδας ] omit
 Luke 10:12 — λεγω ] λεγω δε
 Luke 10:36 — πλησιον δοκει σοι ] δοκει σοι πλησιον

 Luke 20:
 Luke 20:1 — αρχιερεις ] ιερεις
 Luke 20:9 — τις ] omit
 Luke 20:19 — τον λαον ] οχλον
 Luke 20:24 — δηναριον ] δηναριον οι δε εδειξαν και ειπε
 Luke 20:27 — αντιλεγοντες ] λεγοντες
 Luke 20:34 (61 reading) — γαμισκονται ] εκγαμιζονται (TR reads: εκγαμισκονται)
 Luke 20:35 (62 reading) — γαμιζονται ] εκγαμιζονται (TR reads: εκγαμισκονται)

History 

According to the colophon the manuscript was written by monk Gregorius in 1337. It was bought by John Jackson on Conant in Fleet Street, in 1777, for five guineas.

It was added to the list of New Testament manuscript by Scrivener (573) and Gregory (686).

The manuscript is currently housed at the British Library (Add MS 5468), in London.

See also 

 List of New Testament minuscules
 Biblical manuscript
 Textual criticism

References

Further reading 

 T. S. Pattie, Manuscripts of the Bible (London, 1979), 1
 Frederik Wisse, The profile method for the classification and evaluation of manuscript evidence, as Applied to the Continuous Greek Text of the Gospel of Luke, William B. Eerdmans Publishing (Grand Rapids, 1982), pp. 64, 111

Greek New Testament minuscules
13th-century biblical manuscripts
British Library additional manuscripts